Ameer Sabah Hussein Al-Hamadani  (born 10 January 1988 in Baghdad, Iraq) is an Iraqi football winger playing for Al-Zawraa in Iraqi Premier League.

Honours

Club
Al-Zawraa
Iraqi Premier League: 2017–18
Iraq FA Cup: 2018–19
Iraqi Super Cup: 2017

External links
Profile on Goalzz.com

Iraqi footballers
Sportspeople from Baghdad
Living people
1988 births
Amanat Baghdad players
Al-Shorta SC players
Association football wingers
Iraq international footballers